Antti Suomela (born 17 March 1994) is a Finnish professional ice hockey forward currently playing for Lausanne HC in the National League (NL).

Playing career
Suomela made his Liiga debut playing with Espoo Blues during the 2015–16 Liiga season.

He won the Veli-Pekka Ketola trophy for the most points scored during the regular season, posting 21 goals and 60 points in 59 games in the 2017–18 Liiga season with JYP Jyväskylä. He also won the 2017–18 Champions Hockey League with JYP Jyväskylä.

Gaining NHL interest, Suomela agreed to a one-year, entry-level contract with the San Jose Sharks on 6 June 2018. After attending his first NHL training camp with the Sharks, Suomela made the opening night roster for the 2018–19 season. Suomela made his NHL a debut on 3 October, and recorded his first NHL point in a 3–2 win over the Los Angeles Kings on 5 October 2018.

He was re-signed as a restricted free agent by the Sharks to a one-year, two-way contract on 11 July 2019. 

Suomela continued his tenure within the Sharks organization by signing a one-year, two-way contract on 7 October 2020. On 9 October, having remained in Finland due to the COVID-19 pandemic, Suomela was loaned by the Sharks to return to competitive hockey by joining Finnish top flight Liiga club, HIFK, on loan until the commencement of the delayed 2020–21 NHL season. In 10 appearances with HIFK, Suomela added 2 goals and 5 points before returning to the Sharks organization.
He was dealt by the Sharks at the trade deadline to the Toronto Maple Leafs on 12 April 2021 in exchange for Alexander Barabanov.

With his contract concluded with the Maple Leafs, Suomela remained within the organization signing a one-year AHL contract with the Toronto Marlies on 15 June 2021.

Returning to Europe as a free agent for the 2022–23 season, Suomela signed a one-year contract in the Swedish Hockey League (SHL) with IK Oskarshamn on 12 May 2022. Rediscovering his offensive touch, Suomela quickly transitioned into Oskarshamn's top scoring threat and in 51 regular season games he finished top in the SHL in scoring with 37 goals and 66 points. He was awarded the Håkan Loob Trophy and the Guldhjälmen as the league MVP. He made three post-season appearances with Oskarshamn, however was unable to propel the club to the playoffs in losing in three games to Luleå HF in the Eighth finals.

On 13 March 2023, Suomela as a pending free agent opted to leave the SHL after just one season in signing a lucrative two-year contract with Swiss club, Lausanne HC of the NL.

Career statistics

Regular season and playoffs

International

Awards and honours

References

External links

1994 births
Living people
Espoo Blues players
Finnish expatriate ice hockey players in Canada
Finnish expatriate ice hockey players in the United States
Finnish ice hockey forwards
HIFK (ice hockey) players
JYP Jyväskylä players
IK Oskarshamn players
Sportspeople from Espoo
San Jose Barracuda players
San Jose Sharks players
Toronto Marlies players
Undrafted National Hockey League players